Santiago Eduardo Urueta Sierra (24 February 1904 – 23 March 1979), more commonly known as Chano Urueta, was a Mexican film director, producer, screenwriter, and actor.

Filmography

Director

1928: El Destino
1933: Profanación
1934: The Scandal
1934: Enemigos
1934: Una Mujer en venta
1935: Clemencia
1936: Sistemas de riego en Ciudad Delicias, Chihuahua y en Ciudad Anáhuac, Nuevo León
1937: Jalisco nunca pierde
1938: Canción del alma
1938: Hombres de mar
1938: María
1938: Mi candidato
1939: El Signo de la muerte
1939: The Night of the Mayas
1940: ¡Que viene mi marido!
1940: Los de abajo
1941: La Liga de las canciones
1942: The Count of Monte Cristo
1943: Ave sin nido
1943: El Misterioso señor Marquina
1943: Guadalajara
1943: No matarás
1944: El Camino de los gatos
1944: Le Corsaire noir
1945: Camino de Sacramento
1945: El Recuerdo de aquella noche
1946: El Superhombre
1946: La Noche y tú
1947: Mujer
1948: De pecado en pecado
1948: The Desire
1948: En los altos de Jalisco
1948: The Flesh Commands
1948: Jalisco Fair
1948: La feria de Jalisco
1948: La Norteña de mis amores
1948: La Santa del barrio
1948: Se la llevó el Remington
1948: Si Adelita se fuera con otro
1949: Dos almas en el mundo
1949: El Abandonado
1949: El Gran campeón
1949: No me quieras tanto...
1949: Rayito de luna
1949: Ventarrón
1949: Yo maté a Juan Charrasqueado
1950: Al son del mambo
1950: El Desalmado
1950: La Gota de sangre
1950: Mi preferida
1951: Del can-can al mambo
1951: La Estatua de carne
1951: Manos de seda
1951: Peregrina
1951: Serenade in Acapulco
1952: El Cuarto cerrado
1952: Mi campeón
1952: Música, mujeres y amor
1953: El Monstruo resucitado
1953: La Bestia magnifica (Lucha libre)
1953: Quiéreme porque me muero
1954: ¿Por qué ya no me quieres?
1954: La Bruja
1954: La Desconocida
1954: La Perversa
1954: Se solicitan modelos
1955: El Seductor
1955: El Túnel 6
1955: El Vendedor de muñecas
1955: La Rival
1956: La Ilegítima
1956: Serenata en México
1957: El Jinete sin cabeza
1957: El Ratón
1957: Furias desatadas
1957: La Cabeza de Pancho Villa
1957: La Marca de Satanás
1957: Secuestro diabólico
1958: El Jinete negro
1959: Cuando se quiere se quiere
1959: Del suelo no paso
1959: Los Hermanos Diablo
1959: No soy monedita de oro
1960: Bala perdida
1960: El Torneo de la muerte
1960: Herencia trágica
1960: Las Canciones unidas
1960: Los Tigres del ring
1960: Revolver en guardia
1960: Una Bala es mi testigo
1960: Fatal Vengeance
1961: El Hombre de la ametralladora
1961: Guantes de oro
1961: Tres Romeos y una Julieta
1962: Camino de la horca
1962: El Asaltacaminos
1962: Le Baron de la terreur
1962: El Espejo de la bruja
1962: Pilotos de la muerte
1963: La Cabeza viviente
1963: La Muerte en el desfiladero
1963: Los Chacales
1964: Cinco asesinos esperan
1964: El Ciclón de Jalisco
1964: El Robo al tren correo
1964: Lupe Balazos
1965: Demonio azul
1965: Especialista en chamacas
1966: Alma grande
1966: Blue Demon contra el poder satánico
1966: Los Gavilanes negros
1968: Blue Demon contra cerebros infernales
1968: Blue Demon contra las diabólicas
1968: El As de oros
1968: La Puerta y la mujer del carnicero
1971: The Bridge in the Jungle
1972: The Incredible Professor Zovek
1973: Tu camino y el mio
1974: Once Upon a Scoundrel 
1974: Los Leones del ring contra la Cosa Nostra
1974: Los Leones del ring

Actor
1939: Una luz en mi camino
1967: Chanoc - Tsekub Baloyán
1968: Guns for San Sebastian - Miguel
1969: Todo por nada - Nicolás
1969: The Wild Bunch - Don Jose
1969: Super Colt 38
1969: La puerta y la mujer del carnicero - Cura (segment "La mujer del carnicero")
1970: El capitán Mantarraya - El Hippie
1970: Dos esposas en mi cama
1970: El pueblo del terror - Álvaro
1970: El hermano Capulina - Padre Anselmo
1970: Emiliano Zapata
1971: The Bridge in the Jungle - Funeral Singer
1971: Furias bajo el cielo
1971: Los dos hermanos - Rulfo
1971: El Hacedor de Miedo - Old Priest
1972: Kalimán, el hombre increíble
1972: The Wrath of God - Antonio
1974: Las viboras cambian de piel - Fray Jose
1974: Bring Me the Head of Alfredo Garcia - Manchot, the bartender
1974: Once Upon a Scoundrel
1974: La Choca - Don Pomposo (final film role)

External links
 .

Mexican film directors
1904 births
1979 deaths